Women is a 1966 Soviet drama film directed by Pavel Lyubimov. Based on the story of the same name by Irina Velembovskaya.

Plot 
The film takes place after the war. The film tells about women workers, their joys and failures. Yevdokia  Kuzina arrives in the early fifties from the village to the city, accidentally meets a furniture factory worker, Yekaterina  Bednova, a widow with her son, who settles her in her house and helps her get a job at the factory. After a while, Yevdokia begins to meet with Yuri, known to the entire factory. Their relationship ends with an unsuccessful abortion, and Yevdokia  learns that she will no longer have children.

Cast 
 Inna Makarova as Yevdokia  Kuzina  
 Nina Sazonova as Yekaterina  Bednova
 Nadezhda Fedosova as Grusha  
 Galina Yatskina as Alya Yagodkina  
 Valentina Vladimirova as Liza  
 Irina Murzaeva as elevator girl
 Irina Martemyanova as lady at the dance
 Lyusyena Ovchinnikova as Anna
 Viktor Mizin as Vityka  
 Vitali Solomin as Zhenya Bednov  
 Pyotr Lyubeshkin as Konstantin Ivanovich 
 Ye. Mandrykin as episode
 Pyotr Polev as Dimitriy Polev 
 Dmitri Popov as Yura  
 Valeriy Rukin as Zhorka

Release
One of the leaders of the Soviet film distribution in 1966   36.6 million people (6th place).

References

External links 
 

1966 films
1960s Russian-language films
Soviet drama films
1966 romantic drama films
Gorky Film Studio films
Soviet romantic drama films
Films about abortion
Films based on short fiction
1960s female buddy films
Films set in the Soviet Union
Films about widowhood